Siegmund Hurwitz (died 1994) was a Swiss psychoanalyst, Jungian scholar and writer on Jewish mysticism.

Hurwitz was a member of the innermost circle of Carl Jung’s so-called Zurich school and he received his analytical training from Jung, Toni Wolff and Marie-Louise von Franz. Hurwitz was Jung’s dentist for many years and was, together with his wife Leni Hurwitz (one of the original editors of Jung’s Collected Works), also a personal friend. He often advised Jung on questions regarding Jewish mysticism and they shared wide-ranging interests in the fields of philosophy and religion. Hurwitz worked both as a dentist and an analyst for many years, and after his retirement from dentistry, he was able to devote more time to his writing. He was long a scholar of Jewish mysticism and, with his gift for language, was often sought out by Jung and others when there were ancient texts to be consulted.

He continued to maintain a small analytical practice in Zurich until his death in the Summer of 1994.

Works
Hurwitz published numerous articles and books over the course of his long lifetime, contributing to the third volume of Studien aus dem G. G. Jung-Institut and later authoring the eighth volume of the series, Die Gestalt des sterbenden Messiahs on his own.

 Archetypische Motive in der Chassidischen Mystik ("Archetypal motifs in Hassidic Mysticism") ("Studies from the C.G. Jung Institute" Rascher, 1952)
 Die Gestalt des sterbenden Messiahs ("The figure of the dying Messiah") in Zeitlose Dokumente der Seele, Studien aus dem CG Jung-Institut, VIII,  Rascher, 1958),
 Translations: Timeless documents of the soul, Studies in Jungian thought ed. Helmuth Jacobsohn, Marie-Luise von Franz, Siegmund Hurwitz, Staatliche Museen zu Berlin  Northwestern University Press, 1968
 Lilith: Die Erste Eva: Eine Studie uber dunkle Aspekte des Weiblichen, Zurich: Daimon Verlag, 1980 English translation Lilith – The First Eve translated Gela Jacobson.
 The dark face of God in Judaism - essay in Jung and the monotheisms: Judaism, Christianity, and Islam - p 45 ed. Joel Ryce-Menuhin - 1994

References

Swiss writers
Year of birth missing
1994 deaths
Jewish mysticism